The following is a list of players, both past and current, who appeared at least in one game for the Cleveland Cavaliers NBA franchise.



Players
Note: Statistics are correct through the end of the  season.

A to B

|-
|align="left"| || align="center"|F || align="left"|Louisville || align="center"|1 ||  align="center"| || 19 || 194 || 19 || 5 || 32 || 10.2 || 1.0 || 0.3 || 1.7 || align=center|

|-
|align="left"| || align="center"|F || align="left"|South Florida || align="center"|1 ||  align="center"| || 7 || 43 || 12 || 1 || 17 || 6.1 || 1.7 || 0.1 || 2.4 || align=center|

|-
|align="left"| || align="center"|C || align="left"|Weber State || align="center"|1 ||  align="center"| || 3 || 10 || 1 || 0 || 3 || 3.3 || 0.3 || 0.0 || 1.0 || align=center|

|-
|align="left"| || align="center"|F/C || align="left"|Penn State || align="center"|1 ||  align="center"| || 28 || 357 || 52 || 9 || 77 || 12.8 || 1.9 || 0.3 || 2.8 || align=center|

|-
|align="left"| || align="center"|F/C || align="left"|UNLV || align="center"|1 ||  align="center"| || 12 || 79 || 20 || 5 || 11 || 6.6 || 1.7 || 0.4 || 0.9 || align=center|

|-
|align="left"| || align="center"|F/C || align="left"|Blinn || align="center"|1 ||  align="center"| || 12 || 114 || 31 || 5 || 28 || 9.5 || 2.6 || 0.4 || 2.3 || align=center|

|-
|align="left"| || align="center"|G/F || align="left"|Saint Joseph's || align="center"|1 ||  align="center"| || 23 || 171 || 37 || 16 || 79 || 7.4 || 1.6 || 0.7 || 3.4 || align=center|

|-
|align="left"| || align="center"|G || align="left"|Kentucky || align="center"|2 ||  align="center"|– || 104 || 2,817 || 296 || 372 || 1,179 || 27.1 || 2.8 || 3.6 || 11.3 || align=center|

|-
|align="left"| || align="center"|G/F || align="left"|Fresno State || align="center"|2 ||  align="center"|– || 53 || 727 || 114 || 42 || 296 || 13.7 || 2.2 || 0.8 || 5.6 || align=center|

|-
|align="left"| || align="center"|C || align="left"|Lithuania || align="center"|1 ||  align="center"| || 6 || 9 || 4 || 0 || 0 || 1.5 || 0.7 || 0.0 || 0.0 || align=center|

|-
|align="left"| || align="center"|F/C || align="left"|Tennessee Tech || align="center"|1 ||  align="center"| || 12 || 52 || 9 || 4 || 19 || 4.3 || 0.8 || 0.3 || 1.6 || align=center|

|-
|align="left"| || align="center"|G || align="left"|Boston College || align="center"|5 ||  align="center"|– || 375 || 9,757 || 1,070 || 2,311 || 3,542 || 26.0 || 2.9 || 6.2 || 9.4 || align=center|

|-
|align="left"| || align="center"|F/C || align="left"|Texas Tech || align="center"|1 ||  align="center"| || 50 || 977 || 241 || 37 || 272 || 19.5 || 4.8 || 0.7 || 5.4 || align=center|

|-
|align="left"| || align="center"|G || align="left"|Rutgers || align="center"|4 ||  align="center"|– || 196 || 3,228 || 191 || 333 || 1,456 || 16.5 || 1.0 || 1.7 || 7.4 || align=center|

|-
|align="left" bgcolor="#FFCC00"|+ || align="center"|G || align="left"|Louisville || align="center"|2 ||  align="center"| || 83 || 2,689 || 319 || 501 || 1,145 || 32.4 || 3.8 || 6.0 || 13.8 || align=center|

|-
|align="left"| || align="center"|C || align="left"|Creighton || align="center"|1 ||  align="center"| || 3 || 8 || 1 || 0 || 2 || 2.7 || 0.3 || 0.0 || 0.7 || align=center|

|-
|align="left"| || align="center"|F || align="left"|UNLV || align="center"|1 ||  align="center"| || 52 || 663 || 155 || 17 || 217 || 12.8 || 3.0 || 0.3 || 4.2 || align=center|

|-
|align="left"| || align="center"|G || align="left"|Notre Dame || align="center"|1 ||  align="center"| || 4 || 18 || 1 || 3 || 15 || 4.5 || 0.3 || 0.8 || 3.8 || align=center|

|-
|align="left"| || align="center"|F || align="left"|Pittsburgh || align="center"|1 ||  align="center"| || 3 || 23 || 3 || 0 || 5 || 7.7 || 1.0 || 0.0 || 1.7 || align=center|

|-
|align="left"| || align="center"|F || align="left"|Kentucky || align="center"|3 ||  align="center"|– || 134 || 2,155 || 413 || 120 || 646 || 16.1 || 3.1 || 0.9 || 4.8 || align=center|

|-
|align="left"| || align="center"|C || align="left"|Indiana || align="center"|1 ||  align="center"| || 2 || 12 || 1 || 0 || 5 || 6.0 || 0.5 || 0.0 || 2.5 || align=center|

|-
|align="left"| || align="center"|F || align="left"|Clemson || align="center"|1 ||  align="center"| || 27 || 439 || 98 || 13 || 114 || 16.3 || 3.6 || 0.5 || 4.2 || align=center|

|-
|align="left"| || align="center"|F || align="left"|Cincinnati || align="center"|1 ||  align="center"| || 20 || 368 || 105 || 10 || 68 || 18.4 || 5.3 || 0.5 || 3.4 || align=center|

|-
|align="left"| || align="center"|C || align="left"|Utah || align="center"|1 ||  align="center"| || 1 || 1 || 0 || 0 || 0 || 1.0 || 0.0 || 0.0 || 0.0 || align=center|

|-
|align="left"| || align="center"|F || align="left"|Auburn Montgomery || align="center"|1 ||  align="center"| || 6 || 19 || 7 || 0 || 8 || 3.2 || 1.2 || 0.0 || 1.3 || align=center|

|-
|align="left"| || align="center"|F/C || align="left"|Duke || align="center"|2 ||  align="center"|– || 156 || 4,641 || 1,466 || 254 || 1,972 || 29.8 || 9.4 || 1.6 || 12.6 || align=center|

|-
|align="left"| || align="center"|G || align="left"|Eastern Michigan || align="center"|2 ||  align="center"|– || 42 || 423 || 38 || 72 || 176 || 10.1 || 0.9 || 1.7 || 4.2 || align=center|

|-
|align="left"| || align="center"|C || align="left"|Arizona || align="center"|1 ||  align="center"| || 8 || 61 || 22 || 0 || 8 || 7.6 || 2.8 || 0.0 || 1.0 || align=center|

|-
|align="left" bgcolor="#FFCC00"|+ || align="center"|G || align="left"|Oregon || align="center"|6 ||  align="center"|– || 457 || 12,174 || 1,235 || 2,235 || 5,793 || 26.6 || 2.7 || 4.9 || 12.7 || align=center|

|-
|align="left"| || align="center"|F/C || align="left"|SMU || align="center"|1 ||  align="center"| || 10 || 176 || 33 || 6 || 53 || 17.6 || 3.3 || 0.6 || 5.3 || align=center|

|-
|align="left"| || align="center"|G || align="left"|Stanford || align="center"|1 ||  align="center"| || 80 || 2,595 || 198 || 452 || 802 || 32.4 || 2.5 || 5.7 || 10.0 || align=center|

|-
|align="left"| || align="center"|G || align="left"|St. Bonaventure || align="center"|1 ||  align="center"| || 31 || 403 || 33 || 39 || 110 || 13.0 || 1.1 || 1.3 || 3.5 || align=center|

|-
|align="left"| || align="center"|F/C || align="left"|Minnesota || align="center"|6 ||  align="center"|– || 462 || 12,537 || 3,551 || 853 || 3,461 || 27.1 || 7.7 || 1.8 || 7.5 || align=center|

|-
|align="left"| || align="center"|G || align="left"|Arkansas || align="center"|3 ||  align="center"|– || 108 || 2,839 || 201 || 188 || 1,357 || 26.3 || 1.9 || 1.7 || 12.6 || align=center|

|-
|align="left"| || align="center"|G || align="left"|Notre Dame || align="center"|1 ||  align="center"| || 39 || 596 || 59 || 117 || 282 || 15.3 || 1.5 || 3.0 || 7.2 || align=center|

|-
|align="left"| || align="center"|G || align="left"|UC Irvine || align="center"|1 ||  align="center"| || 43 || 312 || 30 || 49 || 79 || 7.3 || 0.7 || 1.1 || 1.8 || align=center|

|-
|align="left"| || align="center"|F || align="left"|NC State || align="center"|4 ||  align="center"|– || 175 || 3,139 || 486 || 139 || 1,265 || 17.9 || 2.8 || 0.8 || 7.2 || align=center|

|-
|align="left"| || align="center"|G || align="left"|UTSA || align="center"|1 ||  align="center"| || 78 || 1,762 || 263 || 175 || 586 || 22.6 || 3.4 || 2.2 || 7.5 || align=center|

|-
|align="left"| || align="center"|G || align="left"|Northwest Florida State || align="center"|1 ||  align="center"| || 34 || 561 || 78 || 39 || 179 || 16.5 || 2.3 || 1.1 || 5.3 || align=center|

|-
|align="left"| || align="center"|G || align="left"|Michigan State || align="center"|2 ||  align="center"|– || 38 || 420 || 39 || 27 || 178 || 11.1 || 1.0 || 0.7 || 4.7 || align=center|

|-
|align="left"| || align="center"|G || align="left"|McNeese State || align="center"|1 ||  align="center"| || 15 || 168 || 30 || 39 || 65 || 11.2 || 2.0 || 2.6 || 4.3 || align=center|

|-
|align="left"| || align="center"|F/C || align="left"|Seton Hall || align="center"|1 ||  align="center"| || 75 || 1,712 || 352 || 61 || 424 || 22.8 || 4.7 || 0.8 || 5.7 || align=center|

|-
|align="left"| || align="center"|G || align="left"|Colorado || align="center"|1 ||  align="center"| || 34 || 979 || 186 || 98 || 396 || 28.8 || 5.5 || 2.9 || 11.6 || align=center|

|-
|align="left"| || align="center"|G/F || align="left"|UCLA || align="center"|2 ||  align="center"|– || 49 || 624 || 66 || 40 || 205 || 12.7 || 1.3 || 0.8 || 4.2 || align=center|

|-
|align="left"| || align="center"|C || align="left"|St. Joseph HS (NJ) || align="center"|1 ||  align="center"| || 24 || 480 || 126 || 27 || 202 || 20.0 || 5.3 || 1.1 || 8.4 || align=center|
|}

C

|-
|align="left"| || align="center"|F/C || align="left"|San Diego State || align="center"|2 ||  align="center"|– || 164 || 4,671 || 1,293 || 109 || 897 || 28.5 || 7.9 || 0.7 || 5.5 || align=center|
|-
|align="left"| || align="center"|G || align="left"|Spain || align="center"|1 ||  align="center"| || 57 || 914 || 84 || 117 || 255 || 16.0 || 1.5 || 2.1 || 4.5 || align=center|
|-
|align="left"| || align="center"|G || align="left"|USC || align="center"|1 ||  align="center"| || 21 || 128 || 12 || 28 || 52 || 6.1 || 0.6 || 1.3 || 2.5 || align=center|
|-
|align="left"| || align="center"|G/F || align="left"|Ohio State || align="center"|1 ||  align="center"| || 78 || 1,128 || 153 || 69 || 469 || 14.5 || 2.0 || 0.9 || 6.0 || align=center|
|-
|align="left" bgcolor="#FFCC00"|+ (#34) || align="center"|G || align="left"|Notre Dame || align="center"|9 ||  align="center"|– || 635 || 19,003 || 1,929 || 1,820 || 10,265 || 29.9 || 3.0 || 2.9 || 16.2 || align=center|
|-
|align="left"| || align="center"|F || align="left"|NC State || align="center"|3 ||  align="center"|– || 201 || 5,878 || 1,800 || 331 || 2,831 || 29.2 || 9.0 || 1.6 || 14.1 || align=center|
|-
|align="left"| || align="center"|F || align="left"|Israel || align="center"|2 ||  align="center"|– || 108 || 1,844 || 342 || 94 || 632 || 17.1 || 3.2 || 0.9 || 5.9 || align=center|
|-
|align="left"| || align="center"|F/C || align="left"|Wake Forest || align="center"|1 ||  align="center"| || 6 || 86 || 18 || 1 || 41 || 14.3 || 3.0 || 0.2 || 6.8 || align=center|
|-
|align="left"| || align="center"|G || align="left"|Montana || align="center"|1 ||  align="center"| || 8 || 69 || 5 || 8 || 15 || 8.6 || 0.6 || 1.0 || 1.9 || align=center|
|-
|align="left"| || align="center"|F || align="left"|Missouri || align="center"|2 ||  align="center"|– || 32 || 209 || 33 || 6 || 92 || 6.5 || 1.0 || 0.2 || 2.9 || align=center|

|-
|align="left"| || align="center"|F/C || align="left"|North Carolina || align="center"|1 ||  align="center"| || 6 || 30 || 9 || 1 || 0 || 5.0 || 1.5 || 0.2 || 0.0 || align=center|

|-
|align="left"| || align="center"|F/C || align="left"|Marquette || align="center"|5 ||  align="center"|– || 400 || 13,302 || 3,790 || 711 || 5,729 || 33.3 || 9.5 || 1.8 || 14.3 || align=center|

|-
|align="left"| || align="center"|F || align="left"|Washington || align="center"|1 ||  align="center"| || 27 || 395 || 114 || 16 || 153 || 14.6 || 4.2 || 0.6 || 5.7 || align=center|

|-
|align="left"| || align="center"|F || align="left"|Louisville || align="center"|1 ||  align="center"| || 45 || 698 || 127 || 16 || 234 || 15.5 || 2.8 || 0.4 || 5.2 || align=center|

|-
|align="left"| || align="center"|G || align="left"|Missouri || align="center"|3 ||  align="center"|– || 138 || 3,512|| 397 || 314 || 2,140 || 25.4 || 2.9 || 2.3 || 15.5 || align=center|

|-
|align="left"| || align="center"|G || align="left"|Ohio State || align="center"|5 ||  align="center"|– || 377 || 10,605 || 1,353 || 1,549 || 3,532 || 28.1 || 3.6 || 4.1 || 9.4 || align=center|

|-
|align="left"| || align="center"|G || align="left"|Michigan State || align="center"|1 ||  align="center"| || 4 || 92 || 7 || 19 || 15 || 23.0 || 1.8 || 4.8 || 3.8 || align=center|

|-
|align="left"| || align="center"|F || align="left"|Ohio Wesleyan || align="center"|2 ||  align="center"|– || 143 || 2,032 || 377 || 195 || 859 || 14.2 || 2.6 || 1.4 || 6.0 || align=center|

|-
|align="left"| || align="center"|G || align="left"|Virginia Tech || align="center"|3 ||  align="center"|– || 115 || 2,013 || 151 || 301 || 483 || 17.5 || 1.3 || 2.6 || 4.2 || align=center|

|-
|align="left"| || align="center"|G || align="left"|New Mexico State || align="center"|1 ||  align="center"| || 57 || 752 || 59 || 101 || 196 || 13.2 || 1.0 || 1.8 || 3.4 || align=center|

|-
|align="left"| || align="center"|F/C || align="left"|Idaho State || align="center"|3 ||  align="center"|– || 129 || 3,172 || 794 || 190 || 792 || 24.6 || 6.2 || 1.5 || 6.1 || align=center|

|-
|align="left"| || align="center"|G || align="left"|Indiana || align="center"|1 ||  align="center"| || 73 || 725 || 114 || 93 || 316 || 9.9 || 1.6 || 1.3 || 4.3 || align=center|

|-
|align="left"| || align="center"|G/F || align="left"|DePaul || align="center"|2 ||  align="center"|– || 86 || 1,586 || 316 || 73 || 522 || 18.4 || 3.7 || 0.8 || 6.1 || align=center|

|-
|align="left"| || align="center"|F || align="left"|Southern Miss || align="center"|1 ||  align="center"| || 23 || 200 || 49 || 9 || 38 || 8.7 || 2.1 || 0.4 || 1.7 || align=center|

|-
|align="left"| || align="center"|C || align="left"|North Carolina || align="center"|1 ||  align="center"| || 7 || 23 || 9 || 1 || 5 || 3.3 || 1.3 || 0.1 || 0.7 || align=center|

|-
|align="left"| || align="center"|G || align="left"|Virginia || align="center"|1 ||  align="center"| || 58 || 617 || 54 || 102 || 172 || 10.6 || 0.9 || 1.8 || 3.0 || align=center|

|-
|align="left"| || align="center"|F || align="left"|Marquette || align="center"|1 ||  align="center"| || 53 || 1,346 || 173 || 58 || 454 || 25.4 || 3.3 || 1.1 || 8.6 || align=center|

|-
|align="left"| || align="center"|G || align="left"|Oregon State || align="center"|1 ||  align="center"| || 40 || 355 || 29 || 19 || 104 || 8.9 || 0.7 || 0.5 || 2.6 || align=center|

|-
|align="left"| || align="center"|G || align="left"|Virginia Tech || align="center"|1 ||  align="center"| || 79 || 1,499 || 166 || 149 || 787 || 19.0 || 2.1 || 1.9 || 10.0 || align=center|

|-
|align="left"| || align="center"|G || align="left"|Duke || align="center"|1 ||  align="center"| || 1 || 9 || 1 || 0 || 3 || 9.0 || 1.0 || 0.0 || 3.0 || align=center|
|}

D

|-
|align="left"| (#43) || align="center"|C || align="left"|North Carolina || align="center"|8 ||  align="center"|– || 548 || 20,029 || 5,227 || 2,028 || 10,389 || 36.5 || 9.5 || 3.7 || 19.0 || align=center|

|-
|align="left"| || align="center"|F || align="left"|Hungary || align="center"|1 ||  align="center"| || 6 || 31 || 8 || 1 || 11 || 5.2 || 1.3 || 0.2 || 1.8 || align=center|

|-
|align="left"| || align="center"|G || align="left"|UCLA || align="center"|1 ||  align="center"| || 15 || 380 || 36 || 92 || 208 || 25.3 || 2.4 || 6.1 || 13.9 || align=center|

|-
|align="left"| || align="center"|G || align="left"|Wake Forest || align="center"|2 ||  align="center"|– || 67 || 1,230 || 97 || 133 || 644 || 18.4 || 1.4 || 2.0 || 9.6 || align=center|

|-
|align="left"| || align="center"|F || align="left"|Houston || align="center"|3 ||  align="center"|– || 235 || 6,592 || 1,671 || 454 || 2,477 || 28.1 || 7.1 || 1.9 || 10.5 || align=center|

|-
|align="left"| || align="center"|F || align="left"|Florida State || align="center"|1 ||  align="center"| || 40 || 394 || 66 || 16 || 162 || 9.9 || 1.7 || 0.4 || 4.1 || align=center|

|-
|align="left"| || align="center"|G || align="left"|Dayton || align="center"|2 ||  align="center"|– || 115 || 2,532 || 155 || 531 || 1,214 || 22.0 || 1.3 || 4.6 || 10.6 || align=center|

|-
|align="left"| || align="center"|G || align="left"|Iowa || align="center"|3 ||  align="center"|– || 183 || 5,881 || 754 || 725 || 2,921 || 32.1 || 4.1 || 4.0 || 16.0 || align=center|

|-
|align="left"| || align="center"|F/C || align="left"|Florida || align="center"|2 ||  align="center"|– || 115 || 2,675 || 631 || 79 || 840 || 23.3 || 5.5 || 0.7 || 7.3 || align=center|

|-
|align="left"| || align="center"|F || align="left"|Wisconsin || align="center"|1 ||  align="center"| || 9 || 169 || 33 || 9 || 57 || 18.8 || 3.7 || 1.0 || 6.3 || align=center|

|-
|align="left" bgcolor="#CCFFCC"|x || align="center"|G || align="left"|Saint Mary's || align="center"|4 ||  align="center"|– || 251 || 5,233 || 478 || 880 || 1,489 || 20.8 || 1.9 || 3.5 || 5.9 || align=center|

|-
|align="left"| || align="center"|F || align="left"|Duke || align="center"|1 ||  align="center"| || 40 || 1,353 || 203 || 98 || 573 || 33.8 || 5.1 || 2.5 || 14.3 || align=center|

|-
|align="left"| || align="center"|F || align="left"|Idaho || align="center"|1 ||  align="center"| || 5 || 12 || 1 || 1 || 2 || 2.4 || 0.2 || 0.2 || 0.4 || align=center|

|-
|align="left"| || align="center"|G || align="left"|Florida State || align="center"|1 ||  align="center"| || 33 || 221 || 15 || 34 || 73 || 6.7 || 0.5 || 1.0 || 2.2 || align=center|

|-
|align="left"| || align="center"|C || align="left"|Senegal || align="center"|4 ||  align="center"|– || 193 || 2,088 || 501 || 97 || 310 || 10.8 || 2.6 || 0.5 || 1.6 || align=center|

|-
|align="left"| || align="center"|C || align="left"|Utah || align="center"|1 ||  align="center"| || 42 || 705 || 168 || 25 || 194 || 16.8 || 4.0 || 0.6 || 4.6 || align=center|

|-
|align="left"| || align="center"|C || align="left"|Kansas || align="center"|1 ||  align="center"| || 58 || 483 || 116 || 22 || 110 || 8.3 || 2.0 || 0.4 || 1.9 || align=center|

|-
|align="left"| || align="center"|C || align="left"|Yale || align="center"|3 ||  align="center"|– || 153 || 1,741 || 504 || 64 || 539 || 11.4 || 3.3 || 0.4 || 3.5 || align=center|

|-
|align="left"| || align="center"|G || align="left"|Kansas City || align="center"|1 ||  align="center"| || 7 || 47 || 5 || 5 || 14 || 6.7 || 0.7 || 0.7 || 2.0 || align=center|

|-
|align="left"| || align="center"|G/F || align="left"|Duke || align="center"|1 ||  align="center"| || 23 || 366 || 47 || 20 || 106 || 15.9 || 2.0 || 0.9 || 4.6 || align=center|
|}

E to F

|-
|align="left"| || align="center"|F/C || align="left"|Washington || align="center"|2 ||  align="center"|– || 92 || 2,921 || 677 || 136 || 1,472 || 31.8 || 7.4 || 1.5 || 16.0 || align=center|

|-
|align="left"| || align="center"|F || align="left"|Little Rock || align="center"|1 ||  align="center"| || 2 || 12 || 2 || 0 || 2 || 6.0 || 1.0 || 0.0 || 1.0 || align=center|

|-
|align="left"| || align="center"|G || align="left"|Providence || align="center"|1 ||  align="center"| || 26 || 410 || 32 || 58 || 105 || 15.8 || 1.2 || 2.2 || 4.0 || align=center|

|-
|align="left"| || align="center"|G/F || align="left"|Washington State || align="center"|7 ||  align="center"|– || 513 || 14,701 || 2,267 || 1,803 || 5,103 || 28.7 || 4.4 || 3.5 || 9.9 || align=center|

|-
|align="left"| || align="center"|G || align="left"|North Carolina || align="center"|1 ||  align="center"| || 38 || 985 || 114 || 62 || 396 || 25.9 || 3.0 || 1.6 || 10.4 || align=center|

|-
|align="left"| || align="center"|C || align="left"|Turkey || align="center"|2 ||  align="center"|– || 32 || 397 || 83 || 10 || 112 || 12.4 || 2.6 || 0.3 || 3.5 || align=center|

|-
|align="left"| || align="center"|G || align="left"|Kansas State || align="center"|1 ||  align="center"| || 8 || 74 || 10 || 20 || 27 || 9.3 || 1.3 || 2.5 || 3.4 || align=center|

|-
|align="left"| || align="center"|F || align="left"|DR Congo || align="center"|2 ||  align="center"|– || 50 || 1,030 || 135 || 39 || 312 || 20.6 || 2.7 || 0.8 || 6.2 || align=center|

|-
|align="left"| || align="center"|G || align="left"|Oakland || align="center"|1 ||  align="center"| || 42 || 386 || 41 || 58 || 166 || 9.2 || 1.0 || 1.4 || 4.0 || align=center|

|-
|align="left"| || align="center"|G || align="left"|Arizona State || align="center"|1 ||  align="center"| || 7 || 38 || 6 || 4 || 19 || 5.4 || 0.9 || 0.6 || 2.7 || align=center|

|-
|align="left"| || align="center"|F/C || align="left"|San Francisco || align="center"|1 ||  align="center"| || 4 || 9 || 1 || 0 || 0 || 2.3 || 0.3 || 0.0 || 0.0 || align=center|

|-
|align="left"| || align="center"|F || align="left"|Duke || align="center"|10 ||  align="center"|– || 723 || 15,045 || 2,162 || 1,045 || 5,643 || 20.8 || 3.0 || 1.4 || 7.8 || align=center|

|-
|align="left"| || align="center"|F || align="left"|Notre Dame || align="center"|1 ||  align="center"| || 53 || 699 || 180 || 47 || 261 || 13.2 || 3.4 || 0.9 || 4.9 || align=center|

|-
|align="left"| || align="center"|F || align="left"|UC Santa Barbara || align="center"|3 ||  align="center"|– || 106 || 1,616 || 286 || 124 || 398 || 15.2 || 2.7 || 1.2 || 3.8 || align=center|

|-
|align="left"| || align="center"|F || align="left"|Miami (OH) || align="center"|2 ||  align="center"|– || 131 || 1,785 || 218 || 165 || 781 || 13.6 || 1.7 || 1.3 || 6.0 || align=center|

|-
|align="left" bgcolor="#FFFF99"|^ || align="center"|G || align="left"|Southern Illinois || align="center"|3 ||  align="center"|– || 66 || 1,970 || 232 || 249 || 964 || 29.8 || 3.5 || 3.8 || 14.6 || align=center|

|-
|align="left"| || align="center"|G || align="left"|Guilford || align="center"|4 ||  align="center"|– || 275 || 9,097 || 803 || 1,061 || 6,329 || 33.1 || 2.9 || 3.9 || 23.0 || align=center|

|-
|align="left"| || align="center"|F || align="left"|Oregon State || align="center"|1 ||  align="center"| || 11 || 47 || 8 || 4 || 15 || 4.3 || 0.7 || 0.4 || 1.4 || align=center|

|-
|align="left"| || align="center"|F/C || align="left"|Arizona || align="center"|4 ||  align="center"|– || 180 || 2,730 || 545 || 119 || 1,213 || 15.2 || 3.0 || 0.7 || 6.7 || align=center|

|-
|align="left"| || align="center"|G/F || align="left"|Michigan State || align="center"|2 ||  align="center"|– || 102 || 1,937 || 203 || 175 || 1,125 || 19.0 || 2.0 || 1.7 || 11.0 || align=center|
|}

G to H

|-
|align="left"| || align="center"|F || align="left"|Florida State || align="center"|2 ||  align="center"|– || 70 || 431 || 82 || 17 || 215 || 6.2 || 1.2 || 0.2 || 3.1 || align=center|

|-
|align="left"| || align="center"|F || align="left"|Boston College || align="center"|1 ||  align="center"| || 33 || 267 || 77 || 10 || 131 || 8.1 || 2.3 || 0.3 || 4.0 || align=center|

|-
|align="left"| || align="center"|F/C || align="left"|Old Dominion || align="center"|1 ||  align="center"| || 74 || 1,670 || 391 || 61 || 842 || 22.6 || 5.3 || 0.8 || 11.4 || align=center|

|-
|align="left"| || align="center"|G || align="left"|Arizona || align="center"|1 ||  align="center"| || 39 || 246 || 15 || 36 || 57 || 6.3 || 0.4 || 0.9 || 1.5 || align=center|

|-
|align="left"| || align="center"|G || align="left"|Alabama || align="center"|4 ||  align="center"|– || 250 || 6,361 || 948 || 326 || 2,062 || 25.4 || 3.8 || 1.3 || 8.2 || align=center|

|-
|align="left"| || align="center"|G || align="left"|Texas || align="center"|7 ||  align="center"|– || 397 || 9,316 || 792 || 775 || 3,115 || 23.5 || 2.0 || 2.0 || 7.8 || align=center|

|-
|align="left"| || align="center"|F || align="left"|Kansas || align="center"|4 ||  align="center"|– || 292 || 8,499 || 2,522 || 324 || 3,488 || 29.1 || 8.6 || 1.1 || 11.9 || align=center|

|-
|align="left"| || align="center"|G || align="left"|Indiana || align="center"|1 ||  align="center"| || 6 || 56 || 1 || 6 || 16 || 9.3 || 0.2 || 1.0 || 2.7 || align=center|

|-
|align="left"| || align="center"|F || align="left"|Oklahoma State || align="center"|1 ||  align="center"| || 39 || 586 || 84 || 18 || 202 || 15.0 || 2.2 || 0.5 || 5.2 || align=center|

|-
|align="left"| || align="center"|G || align="left"|Oklahoma State || align="center"|1 ||  align="center"| || 13 || 117 || 17 || 3 || 36 || 9.0 || 1.3 || 0.2 || 2.8 || align=center|

|-
|align="left"| || align="center"|G || align="left"|Villanova || align="center"|1 ||  align="center"| || 56 || 738 || 55 || 134 || 251 || 13.2 || 1.0 || 2.4 || 4.5 || align=center|

|-
|align="left"| || align="center"|G || align="left"|Yale || align="center"|1 ||  align="center"| || 4 || 11 || 2 || 1 || 5 || 2.8 || 0.5 || 0.3 || 1.3 || align=center|

|-
|align="left"| || align="center"|G/F || align="left"|North Carolina || align="center"|1 ||  align="center"| || 20 || 115 || 17 || 5 || 40 || 5.8 || 0.9 || 0.3 || 2.0 || align=center|

|-
|align="left"| || align="center"|F || align="left"|Georgetown || align="center"|1 ||  align="center"| || 78 || 1,828 || 246 || 99 || 846 || 23.4 || 3.2 || 1.3 || 10.8 || align=center|

|-
|align="left"| || align="center"|G || align="left"|Georgia || align="center"|1 ||  align="center"| || 1 || 2 || 0 || 0 || 0 || 2.0 || 0.0 || 0.0 || 0.0 || align=center|

|-
|align="left"| || align="center"|C || align="left"|Minnesota Duluth || align="center"|2 ||  align="center"|– || 64 || 346 || 97 || 20 || 98 || 5.4 || 1.5 || 0.3 || 1.5 || align=center|

|-
|align="left"| || align="center"|F/C || align="left"|St. John's || align="center"|1 ||  align="center"| || 11 || 46 || 11 || 0 || 25 || 4.2 || 1.0 || 0.0 || 2.3 || align=center|

|-
|align="left"| || align="center"|F || align="left"|Notre Dame || align="center"|2 ||  align="center"|– || 42 || 630 || 141 || 26 || 190 || 15.0 || 3.4 || 0.6 || 4.5 || align=center|

|-
|align="left"| || align="center"|G/F || align="left"|Miami (OH) || align="center"|4 ||  align="center"|– || 228 || 8,007 || 1,072 || 1,158 || 4,433 || 35.1 || 4.7 || 5.1 || 19.4 || align=center|

|-
|align="left"| || align="center"|F || align="left"|Georgia Tech || align="center"|1 ||  align="center"| || 56 || 1,615 || 242 || 102 || 623 || 28.8 || 4.3 || 1.8 || 11.1 || align=center|

|-
|align="left"| || align="center"|G || align="left"|Virginia || align="center"|2 ||  align="center"|– || 56 || 508 || 44 || 28 || 139 || 9.1 || 0.8 || 0.5 || 2.5 || align=center|

|-
|align="left"| || align="center"|G || align="left"|Long Beach State || align="center"|1 ||  align="center"| || 73 || 1,128 || 121 || 49 || 313 || 15.5 || 1.7 || 0.7 || 4.3 || align=center|

|-
|align="left"| || align="center"|G || align="left"|Michigan || align="center"|2 ||  align="center"|– || 80 || 1,389 || 210 || 116 || 494 || 17.4 || 2.6 || 1.5 || 6.2 || align=center|

|-
|align="left"| || align="center"|G || align="left"|Kentucky || align="center"|1 ||  align="center"| || 10 || 144 || 15 || 17 || 43 || 14.4 || 1.5 || 1.7 || 4.3 || align=center|

|-
|align="left"| || align="center"|F/C || align="left"|Washington || align="center"|1 ||  align="center"| || 27 || 804 || 208 || 64 || 365 || 29.8 || 7.7 || 2.4 || 13.5 || align=center|

|-
|align="left"| || align="center"|G || align="left"|Xavier || align="center"|1 ||  align="center"| || 10 || 76 || 5 || 13 || 8 || 7.6 || 0.5 || 1.3 || 0.8 || align=center|

|-
|align="left"| || align="center"|C || align="left"|Idaho State || align="center"|1 ||  align="center"| || 65 || 1,058 || 236 || 36 || 237 || 16.3 || 3.6 || 0.6 || 3.6 || align=center|

|-
|align="left"| || align="center"|C || align="left"|North Carolina || align="center"|1 ||  align="center"| || 22 || 119 || 29 || 2 || 35 || 5.4 || 1.3 || 0.1 || 1.6 || align=center|

|-
|align="left"| || align="center"|F || align="left"|Indiana || align="center"|1 ||  align="center"| || 51 || 531 || 137 || 10 || 127 || 10.4 || 2.7 || 0.2 || 2.5 || align=center|

|-
|align="left"| || align="center"|F || align="left"|Memphis || align="center"|4 ||  align="center"|– || 248 || 6,112 || 752 || 415 || 1,849 || 24.6 || 3.0 || 1.7 || 7.5 || align=center|

|-
|align="left"| || align="center"|G || align="left"|Cal State Fullerton || align="center"|1 ||  align="center"| || 5 || 20 || 4 || 2 || 9 || 4.0 || 0.8 || 0.4 || 1.8 || align=center|

|-
|align="left"| || align="center"|F || align="left"|Washington State || align="center"|1 ||  align="center"| || 10 || 47 || 11 || 3 || 12 || 4.7 || 1.1 || 0.3 || 1.2 || align=center|

|-
|align="left"| || align="center"|G/F || align="left"|Villanova || align="center"|1 ||  align="center"| || 30 || 269 || 21 || 23 || 85 || 9.0 || 0.7 || 0.8 || 2.8 || align=center|

|-
|align="left"| || align="center"|F/C || align="left"|NC State || align="center"|3 ||  align="center"|– || 223 || 4,652 || 1,260 || 140 || 2,039 || 20.9 || 5.7 || 0.6 || 9.1 || align=center|

|-
|align="left"| || align="center"|F || align="left"|Fresno State || align="center"|1 ||  align="center"| || 36 || 547 || 82 || 36 || 195 || 15.2 || 2.3 || 1.0 || 5.4 || align=center|

|-
|align="left"| || align="center"|G || align="left"|LSU || align="center"|1 ||  align="center"| || 68 || 1,050 || 102 || 141 || 339 || 15.4 || 1.5 || 2.1 || 5.0 || align=center|

|-
|align="left"| || align="center"|G || align="left"|IUPUI || align="center"|2 ||  align="center"|– || 37 || 1,013 || 91 || 103 || 366 || 27.4 || 2.5 || 2.8 || 9.9 || align=center|

|-
|align="left"| || align="center"|F || align="left"|Xavier || align="center"|6 ||  align="center"|–– || 303 || 9,020 || 2,785 || 281 || 3,274 || 29.8 || 9.2 || 0.9 || 10.8 || align=center|

|-
|align="left"| || align="center"|F/C || align="left"|Rutgers || align="center"|3 ||  align="center"|– || 238 || 7,036 || 1,734 || 239 || 3,244 || 29.6 || 7.3 || 1.0 || 13.6 || align=center|

|-
|align="left"| || align="center"|G/F || align="left"|Boston University || align="center"|2 ||  align="center"|– || 25 || 175 || 24 || 5 || 54 || 7.0 || 1.0 || 0.2 || 2.2 || align=center|

|-
|align="left"| || align="center"|C || align="left"|UCLA || align="center"|2 ||  align="center"|– || 94 || 1,544 || 242 || 32 || 462 || 16.4 || 2.6 || 0.3 || 4.9 || align=center|

|-
|align="left"| || align="center"|G/F || align="left"|Duke || align="center"|2 ||  align="center"|– || 66 || 1,766 || 166 || 122 || 774 || 26.8 || 2.5 || 1.8 || 11.7 || align=center|

|-
|align="left"| || align="center"|G || align="left"|Tennessee || align="center"|1 ||  align="center"| || 2 || 7 || 0 || 1 || 1 || 3.5 || 0.0 || 0.5 || 0.5 || align=center|

|-
|align="left"| || align="center"|F/C || align="left"|New Mexico || align="center"|1 ||  align="center"| || 48 || 426 || 108 || 27 || 139 || 8.9 || 2.3 || 0.6 || 2.9 || align=center|

|-
|align="left"| || align="center"|G || align="left"|Maryland || align="center"|1 ||  align="center"| || 9 || 28 || 5 || 5 || 21 || 3.1 || 0.6 || 0.6 || 2.3 || align=center|

|-
|align="left"| || align="center"|F/C || align="left"|Michigan || align="center"|8 ||  align="center"|– || 469 || 11,281 || 2,360 || 570 || 4,962 || 24.1 || 5.0 || 1.2 || 10.6 || align=center|

|-
|align="left"| || align="center"|G || align="left"|UT Martin || align="center"|1 ||  align="center"| || 13 || 314 || 46 || 35 || 165 || 24.2 || 3.5 || 2.7 || 12.7 || align=center|

|-
|align="left"| || align="center"|G || align="left"|Saint Louis || align="center"|3 ||  align="center"|– || 146 || 5,087 || 571 || 481 || 2,094 || 34.8 || 3.9 || 3.3 || 14.3 || align=center|

|-
|align="left"| || align="center"|G || align="left"|Texas Tech || align="center"|5 ||  align="center"|– || 268 || 7,801 || 445 || 1,630 || 2,788 || 29.1 || 1.7 || 6.1 || 10.4 || align=center|
|}

I to J

|-
|align="left" bgcolor="#FFCC00"|+ (#11) || align="center"|C || align="left"|Lithuania || align="center" bgcolor="#CFECEC"|12 ||  align="center"|–– || 771 || 21,820 || 5,904 || 929 || 10,616 || 28.3 || 7.7 || 1.2 || 13.8 || align=center|

|-
|align="left" bgcolor="#FFCC00"|+ || align="center"|G || align="left"|Duke || align="center"|6 ||  align="center"|– || 381 || 13,024 || 1,290 || 2,114 || 8,232 || 34.2 || 3.4 || 5.5 || 21.6 || align=center|

|-
|align="left"| || align="center"|G || align="left"|Georgia Tech || align="center"|1 ||  align="center"| || 80 || 2,252 || 223 || 324 || 760 || 28.2 || 2.8 || 4.1 || 9.5 || align=center|

|-
|align="left"| || align="center"|G || align="left"|Cleveland State || align="center"|1 ||  align="center"| || 5 || 10 || 1 || 2 || 1 || 2.0 || 0.2 || 0.4 || 0.2 || align=center|

|-
|align="left"| || align="center"|F || align="left"|Kansas || align="center"|2 ||  align="center"|– || 78 || 544 || 107 || 12 || 119 || 7.0 || 1.4 || 0.2 || 1.5 || align=center|

|-
|align="left"| || align="center"|G || align="left"|Ohio State || align="center"|1 ||  align="center"| || 39 || 1,140 || 145 || 113 || 400 || 29.2 || 3.7 || 2.9 || 10.3 || align=center|

|-
|align="left"| || align="center"|F || align="left"|Oregon || align="center"|2 ||  align="center"|– || 46 || 358 || 46 || 28 || 125 || 7.8 || 1.0 || 0.6 || 2.7 || align=center|

|-
|align="left"| || align="center"|F || align="left"|St. Mary's (TX) || align="center"|3 ||  align="center"|– || 130 || 1,537 || 206 || 62 || 798 || 11.8 || 1.6 || 0.5 || 6.1 || align=center|

|-
|align="left" bgcolor="#FFCC00"|+ || align="center"|G/F || align="left"|St. Vincent–St. Mary HS (OH) || align="center"|11 ||  align="center"|–– || bgcolor="#CFECEC"|849 || bgcolor="#CFECEC"|33,130 || bgcolor="#CFECEC"|6,190 || bgcolor="#CFECEC"|6,228 || bgcolor="#CFECEC"|23,119 || bgcolor="#CFECEC"|39.0 || 7.3 || 7.3 || bgcolor="#CFECEC"|27.2 || align=center|

|-
|align="left"| || align="center"|F || align="left"|North Carolina || align="center"|3 ||  align="center"|– || 146 || 4,804 || 976 || 256 || 2,523 || 32.9 || 6.7 || 1.8 || 17.3 || align=center|

|-
|align="left"| || align="center"|F || align="left"|Arizona || align="center"|2 ||  align="center"|– || 153 || 2,940 || 331 || 137 || 858 || 19.2 || 2.2 || 0.9 || 5.6 || align=center|

|-
|align="left"| || align="center"|G || align="left"|College of Charleston || align="center"|1 ||  align="center"| || 28 || 232 || 21 || 44 || 66 || 8.3 || 0.8 || 1.6 || 2.4 || align=center|

|-
|align="left"| || align="center"|G || align="left"|Michigan State || align="center"|1 ||  align="center"| || 11 || 28 || 2 || 1 || 12 || 2.5 || 0.2 || 0.1 || 1.1 || align=center|

|-
|align="left"| || align="center"|G || align="left"|Auburn || align="center"|1 ||  align="center"| || 32 || 615 || 46 || 114 || 315 || 19.2 || 1.4 || 3.6 || 9.8 || align=center|

|-
|align="left" bgcolor="#FFCC00"|+ || align="center"|F || align="left"|Iowa || align="center"|3 ||  align="center"|– || 231 || 8,166 || 1,636 || 1,047 || 3,684 || 35.4 || 7.1 || 4.5 || 15.9 || align=center|

|-
|align="left"| || align="center"|F || align="left"|Western Kentucky || align="center"|1 ||  align="center"| || 4 || 12 || 0 || 0 || 2 || 3.0 || 0.0 || 0.0 || 0.5 || align=center|

|-
|align="left"| || align="center"|G || align="left"|California || align="center"|1 ||  align="center"| || 52 || 1,043 || 72 || 193 || 380 || 20.1 || 1.4 || 3.7 || 7.3 || align=center|

|-
|align="left"| || align="center"|F/C || align="left"|Tennessee || align="center"|1 ||  align="center"| || 23 || 617 || 125 || 22 || 223 || 26.8 || 5.4 || 1.0 || 9.7 || align=center|

|-
|align="left"| || align="center"|G || align="left"|Jackson State || align="center"|1 ||  align="center"| || 4 || 14 || 1 || 0 || 4 || 3.5 || 0.3 || 0.0 || 1.0 || align=center|

|-
|align="left"| || align="center"|G/F || align="left"|Duke || align="center"|2 ||  align="center"|– || 2 || 54 || 7 || 3 || 22 || 27.0 || 3.5 || 1.5 || 11.0 || align=center|

|-
|align="left"| || align="center"|G || align="left"|Houston || align="center"|3 ||  align="center"|– || 209 || 4,598 || 271 || 389 || 1,382 || 22.0 || 1.3 || 1.9 || 6.6 || align=center|

|-
|align="left"| || align="center"|F/C || align="left"|Saint Joseph's || align="center"|2 ||  align="center"|– || 60 || 490 || 146 || 10 || 81 || 8.2 || 2.4 || 0.2 || 1.4 || align=center|

|-
|align="left"| || align="center"|F/C || align="left"|Nevada || align="center"|2 ||  align="center"|– || 79 || 1,458 || 316 || 56 || 726 || 18.5 || 4.0 || 0.7 || 9.2 || align=center|

|-
|align="left"| || align="center"|G || align="left"|Texas A&M || align="center"|1 ||  align="center"| || 16 || 214 || 34 || 7 || 81 || 13.4 || 2.1 || 0.4 || 5.1 || align=center|

|-
|align="left"| || align="center"|G/F || align="left"|Miami (FL) || align="center"|3 ||  align="center"|– || 153 || 1,513 || 149 || 52 || 560 || 9.9 || 1.0 || 0.3 || 3.7 || align=center|

|-
|align="left"| || align="center"|F || align="left"|Georgia || align="center"|2 ||  align="center"|– || 161 || 4,346 || 895 || 228 || 1,455 || 27.0 || 5.6 || 1.4 || 9.0 || align=center|

|-
|align="left"| || align="center"|F || align="left"|West Virginia || align="center"|1 ||  align="center"| || 32 || 334 || 78 || 10 || 95 || 10.4 || 2.4 || 0.3 || 3.0 || align=center|

|-
|align="left"| || align="center"|G || align="left"|Rutgers || align="center"|1 ||  align="center"| || 22 || 171 || 11 || 32 || 50 || 7.8 || 0.5 || 1.5 || 2.3 || align=center|

|-
|align="left"| || align="center"|F || align="left"|Purdue || align="center"|1 ||  align="center"| || 30 || 207 || 42 || 11 || 68 || 6.9 || 1.4 || 0.4 || 2.3 || align=center|
|}

K to L

|-
|align="left"| || align="center"|F || align="left"|UCLA || align="center"|1 ||  align="center"| || 41 || 427 || 55 || 14 || 145 || 10.4 || 1.3 || 0.3 || 3.5 || align=center|

|-
|align="left"| || align="center"|G/F || align="left"|Russia || align="center"|1 ||  align="center"| || 22 || 156 || 16 || 6 || 37 || 7.1 || 0.7 || 0.3 || 1.7 || align=center|

|-
|align="left"| || align="center"|G || align="left"|Boise State || align="center"|1 ||  align="center"| || 3 || 5 || 2 || 0 || 0 || 1.7 || 0.7 || 0.0 || 0.0 || align=center|

|-
|align="left"| || align="center"|C || align="left"|Kansas || align="center"|1 ||  align="center"| || 25 || 95 || 26 || 3 || 23 || 3.8 || 1.0 || 0.1 || 0.9 || align=center|

|-
|align="left" bgcolor="#FFCC00"|+ || align="center"|F/C || align="left"|Concord HS (IN) || align="center"|3 ||  align="center"|– || 204 || 6,736 || 1,858 || 436 || 3,767 || 33.0 || 9.1 || 2.1 || 18.5 || align=center|

|-
|align="left"| || align="center"|F/C || align="left"|Notre Dame || align="center"|1 ||  align="center"| || 4 || 33 || 10 || 3 || 14 || 8.3 || 2.5 || 0.8 || 3.5 || align=center|

|-
|align="left"| || align="center"|F || align="left"|St. John's || align="center"|1 ||  align="center"| || 2 || 59 || 7 || 3 || 12 || 29.5 || 3.5 || 1.5 || 6.0 || align=center|

|-
|align="left"| || align="center"|F || align="left"|Memphis || align="center"|1 ||  align="center"| || 32 || 624 || 117 || 34 || 235 || 19.5 || 3.7 || 1.1 || 7.3 || align=center|

|-
|align="left"| || align="center"|G || align="left"|Arizona || align="center"|4 ||  align="center"|– || 188 || 3,457 || 220 || 500 || 1,122 || 18.4 || 1.2 || 2.7 || 6.0 || align=center|

|-
|align="left"| || align="center"|F/C || align="left"|UMass || align="center"|1 ||  align="center"| || 16 || 91 || 27 || 0 || 24 || 5.7 || 1.7 || 0.0 || 1.5 || align=center|

|-
|align="left"| || align="center"|G/F || align="left"|Southern Miss || align="center"|2 ||  align="center"|– || 90 || 1,223 || 193 || 58 || 534 || 13.6 || 2.1 || 0.6 || 5.9 || align=center|

|-
|align="left"| || align="center"|G || align="left"|Charlotte || align="center"|1 ||  align="center"| || 29 || 247 || 24 || 35 || 80 || 8.5 || 0.8 || 1.2 || 2.8 || align=center|

|-
|align="left"| || align="center"|G || align="left"|South Carolina || align="center"|1 ||  align="center"| || 50 || 277 || 38 || 10 || 102 || 5.5 || 0.8 || 0.2 || 2.0 || align=center|

|-
|align="left"| || align="center"|C || align="left"|New Mexico || align="center"|1 ||  align="center"| || 5 || 14 || 1 || 1 || 4 || 2.8 || 0.2 || 0.2 || 0.8 || align=center|

|-
|align="left" bgcolor="#CCFFCC"|x || align="center"|G || align="left"|Kentucky || align="center"|1 ||  align="center"| || 27 || 618 || 50 || 62 || 230 || 22.9 || 1.9 || 2.3 || 8.5 || align=center|

|-
|align="left"| || align="center"|G || align="left"|Stanford || align="center"|4 ||  align="center"|– || 190 || 5,516 || 584 || 1,441 || 1,707 || 29.0 || 3.1 || 7.6 || 9.0 || align=center|

|-
|align="left"| || align="center"|G/F || align="left"|Creighton || align="center"|3 ||  align="center"|– || 124 || 2,684 || 291 || 140 || 1,153 || 21.6 || 2.3 || 1.1 || 9.3 || align=center|

|-
|align="left"| || align="center"|C || align="left"|New Mexico State || align="center"|1 ||  align="center"| || 60 || 1,232 || 231 || 118 || 253 || 20.5 || 3.9 || 2.0 || 4.2 || align=center|

|-
|align="left"| || align="center"|C || align="left"|Notre Dame || align="center"|2 ||  align="center"|– || 131 || 3,354 || 970 || 261 || 1,125 || 25.6 || 7.4 || 2.0 || 8.6 || align=center|

|-
|align="left"| || align="center"|F/C || align="left"|USC || align="center"|6 ||  align="center"|– || 340 || 4,325 || 1,225 || 187 || 1,333 || 12.7 || 3.6 || 0.6 || 3.9 || align=center|

|-
|align="left"| || align="center"|F || align="left"|Pittsburgh || align="center"|1 ||  align="center"| || 21 || 149 || 53 || 17 || 59 || 7.1 || 2.5 || 0.8 || 2.8 || align=center|

|-
|align="left"| || align="center"|G/F || align="left"|Duke || align="center"|3 ||  align="center"|– || 115 || 1,275 || 196 || 46 || 300 || 11.1 || 1.7 || 0.4 || 2.6 || align=center|

|-
|align="left"| || align="center"|G || align="left"|Duke || align="center"|3 ||  align="center"|– || 119 || 1,738 || 159 || 152 || 647 || 14.6 || 1.3 || 1.3 || 5.4 || align=center|

|-
|align="left"| || align="center"|G || align="left"|Marquette || align="center"|2 ||  align="center"|– || 36 || 806 || 70 || 129 || 383 || 22.4 || 1.9 || 3.6 || 10.6 || align=center|

|-
|align="left"| || align="center"|F/C || align="left"|Memphis || align="center"|2 ||  align="center"|– || 125 || 2,067 || 602 || 136 || 843 || 16.5 || 4.8 || 1.1 || 6.7 || align=center|

|-
|align="left"| || align="center"|F || align="left"|Wisconsin || align="center"|1 ||  align="center"| || 9 || 91 || 13 || 5 || 22 || 10.1 || 1.4 || 0.6 || 2.4 || align=center|

|-
|align="left"| || align="center"|G || align="left"|North Carolina || align="center"|1 ||  align="center"| || 79 || 1,852 || 206 || 244 || 467 || 23.4 || 2.6 || 3.1 || 5.9 || align=center|

|-
|align="left"| || align="center"|G || align="left"|Kentucky || align="center"|1 ||  align="center"| || 61 || 752 || 101 || 54 || 144 || 12.3 || 1.7 || 0.9 || 2.4 || align=center|

|-
|align="left"| || align="center"|G || align="left"|Peoria HS (IL) || align="center"|1 ||  align="center"| || 49 || 1,135 || 121 || 177 || 354 || 23.2 || 2.5 || 3.6 || 7.2 || align=center|

|-
|align="left" bgcolor="#FBCEB1"|* || align="center"|F || align="left"|UCLA || align="center"|5 ||  align="center"|– || 293 || 9,090 || 2,944 || 621 || 5,017 || 31.0 || 10.0 || 2.1 || 17.1 || align=center|
|}

M

|-
|align="left"| || align="center"|G || align="left"|UCLA || align="center"|2 ||  align="center"|– || 29 || 177 || 11 || 20 || 43 || 6.1 || 0.4 || 0.7 || 1.5 || align=center|

|-
|align="left"| || align="center"|F || align="left"|Kansas || align="center"|1 ||  align="center"| || 14 || 56 || 10 || 2 || 12 || 4.0 || 0.7 || 0.1 || 0.9 || align=center|

|-
|align="left"| || align="center"|G/F || align="left"|Central Michigan || align="center"|1 ||  align="center"| || 82 || 2,367 || 305 || 214 || 872 || 28.9 || 3.7 || 2.6 || 10.6 || align=center|

|-
|align="left"| || align="center"|F || align="left"|UNLV || align="center"|1 ||  align="center"| || 57 || 1,101 || 202 || 51 || 276 || 19.3 || 3.5 || 0.9 || 4.8 || align=center|

|-
|align="left"| || align="center"|F || align="left"|UConn || align="center"|3 ||  align="center"|– || 96 || 795 || 97 || 31 || 263 || 8.3 || 1.0 || 0.3 || 2.7 || align=center|

|-
|align="left"| || align="center"|F || align="left"|UConn || align="center"|3 ||  align="center"|– || 173 || 3,593 || 845 || 111 || 1,357 || 20.8 || 4.9 || 0.6 || 7.8 || align=center|

|-
|align="left"| || align="center"|G || align="left"|UNLV || align="center"|1 ||  align="center"| || 3 || 53 || 3 || 2 || 5 || 17.7 || 1.0 || 0.7 || 1.7 || align=center|

|-
|align="left"| || align="center"|C || align="left"|UCLA || align="center"|1 ||  align="center"| || 2 || 12 || 4 || 0 || 0 || 6.0 || 2.0 || 0.0 || 0.0 || align=center|

|-
|align="left"| || align="center"|G/F || align="left"|Louisville || align="center"|1 ||  align="center"| || 24 || 279 || 58 || 23 || 80 || 11.6 || 2.4 || 1.0 || 3.3 || align=center|

|-
|align="left"| || align="center"|F || align="left"|UC Irvine || align="center"|1 ||  align="center"| || 21 || 266 || 38 || 9 || 61 || 12.7 || 1.8 || 0.4 || 2.9 || align=center|

|-
|align="left"| || align="center"|G || align="left"|North Carolina || align="center"|2 ||  align="center"|– || 107 || 3,747 || 239 || 625 || 1,338 || 35.0 || 2.2 || 5.8 || 12.5 || align=center|

|-
|align="left"| || align="center"|F/C || align="left"|Drake || align="center"|1 ||  align="center"| || 58 || 1,839 || 463 || 176 || 678 || 31.7 || 8.0 || 3.0 || 11.7 || align=center|

|-
|align="left"| || align="center"|G || align="left"|Tennessee || align="center"|2 ||  align="center"|– || 52 || 497 || 53 || 34 || 223 || 9.6 || 1.0 || 0.7 || 4.3 || align=center|

|-
|align="left"| || align="center"|C || align="left"|Texas || align="center"|4 ||  align="center"|– || 207 || 4,025 || 1,043 || 78 || 1,475 || 19.4 || 5.0 || 0.4 || 7.1 || align=center|

|-
|align="left"| || align="center"|F || align="left"|Minnesota || align="center"|1 ||  align="center"| || 53 || 536 || 139 || 41 || 158 || 10.1 || 2.6 || 0.8 || 3.0 || align=center|

|-
|align="left"| || align="center"|G/F || align="left"|Skyline HS (TX) || align="center"|2 ||  align="center"|– || 116 || 2,348 || 277 || 115 || 1,232 || 20.2 || 2.4 || 1.0 || 10.6 || align=center|

|-
|align="left"| || align="center"|F || align="left"|East St. Louis HS (IL) || align="center"|2 ||  align="center"|– || 104 || 2,896 || 530 || 256 || 948 || 27.8 || 5.1 || 2.5 || 9.1 || align=center|

|-
|align="left"| || align="center"|G || align="left"|Utah || align="center"|3 ||  align="center"|– || 245 || 7,964 || 1,019 || 2,015 || 3,545 || 32.5 || 4.2 || bgcolor="#CFECEC"|8.2 || 14.5 || align=center|

|-
|align="left"| || align="center"|G/F || align="left"|Florida || align="center"|1 ||  align="center"| || 52 || 701 || 91 || 46 || 109 || 13.5 || 1.8 || 0.9 || 2.1 || align=center|

|-
|align="left"| || align="center"|F || align="left"|Arizona || align="center"|4 ||  align="center"|– || 319 || 11,063 || 1,707 || 668 || 4,006 || 34.7 || 5.4 || 2.1 || 12.6 || align=center|

|-
|align="left"| || align="center"|G || align="left"|USC || align="center"|1 ||  align="center"| || 19 || 136 || 12 || 8 || 61 || 7.2 || 0.6 || 0.4 || 3.2 || align=center|

|-
|align="left"| || align="center"|G || align="left"|Kentucky || align="center"|2 ||  align="center"|– || 87 || 1,253 || 141 || 282 || 444 || 14.4 || 1.6 || 3.2 || 5.1 || align=center|

|-
|align="left" bgcolor="#FFCC00"|+ || align="center"|F || align="left"|Auburn || align="center"|4 ||  align="center"|– || 271 || 8,545 || 1,563 || 331 || 5,217 || 31.5 || 5.8 || 1.2 || 19.3 || align=center|

|-
|align="left"| || align="center"|F/C || align="left"|UCLA || align="center"|1 ||  align="center"| || 4 || 27 || 7 || 1 || 6 || 6.8 || 1.8 || 0.3 || 1.5 || align=center|

|-
|align="left"| || align="center"|F/C || align="left"|Kansas || align="center"|3 ||  align="center"|– || 89 || 1,333 || 323 || 54 || 370 || 15.0 || 3.6 || 0.6 || 4.2 || align=center|

|-
|align="left"| || align="center"|F || align="left"|Meridian CC || align="center"|2 ||  align="center"|– || 101 || 1,816 || 309 || 94 || 485 || 18.0 || 3.1 || 0.9 || 4.8 || align=center|

|-
|align="left"| || align="center"|G || align="left"|West Virginia || align="center"|1 ||  align="center"| || 4 || 70 || 4 || 15 || 45 || 17.5 || 1.0 || 3.8 || 11.3 || align=center|

|-
|align="left"| || align="center"|G || align="left"|Seton Hall || align="center"|3 ||  align="center"|– || 107 || 1,663 || 142 || 315 || 517 || 15.5 || 1.3 || 2.9 || 4.8 || align=center|

|-
|align="left"| || align="center"|C || align="left"|Russia || align="center"|2 ||  align="center"|– || 122 || 2,474 || 656 || 72 || 961 || 20.3 || 5.4 || 0.6 || 7.9 || align=center|

|-
|align="left"| || align="center"|F || align="left"|California || align="center"|3 ||  align="center"|– || 223 || 6,902 || 1,135 || 413 || 3,349 || 31.0 || 5.1 || 1.9 || 15.0 || align=center|

|-
|align="left"| || align="center"|G || align="left"|Shaw || align="center"|1 ||  align="center"| || 28 || 1,027 || 67 || 77 || 377 || 36.7 || 2.4 || 2.8 || 13.5 || align=center|
|}

N to P

|-
|align="left"| || align="center"|F || align="left"|TCU || align="center"|1 ||  align="center"| || 22 || 397 || 66 || 17 || 170 || 18.0 || 3.0 || 0.8 || 7.7 || align=center|

|-
|align="left" bgcolor="#FFCC00"|+ (#22) || align="center"|F/C || align="left"|Clemson || align="center"|7 ||  align="center"|– || 433 || 14,966 || 3,561 || 1,145 || 7,257 || 34.6 || 8.2 || 2.6 || 16.8 || align=center|

|-
|align="left"| || align="center"|F/C || align="left"|Wyoming || align="center"|2 ||  align="center"|– || 91 || 2,294 || 720 || 239 || 840 || 25.2 || 7.9 || 2.6 || 9.2 || align=center|

|-
|align="left"| || align="center"|F || align="left"|Miami (OH) || align="center"|5 ||  align="center"|– || 230 || 4,209 || 575 || 188 || 963 || 18.3 || 2.5 || 0.8 || 4.2 || align=center|

|-
|align="left"| || align="center"|G/F || align="left"|Richmond || align="center"|2 ||  align="center"| || 109 || 1,579 || 145 || 68 || 596 || 14.5 || 1.3 || 0.6 || 5.5 || align=center|

|-
|align="left"| || align="center"|F || align="left"|Syracuse || align="center"|1 ||  align="center"| || 3 || 14 || 1 || 0 || 2 || 4.7 || 0.3 || 0.0 || 0.7 || align=center|

|-
|align="left"| || align="center"|G || align="left"|Indiana State || align="center"|1 ||  align="center"| || 9 || 148 || 26 || 11 || 63 || 16.4 || 2.9 || 1.2 || 7.0 || align=center|

|-
|align="left"| || align="center"|G || align="left"|Cal Poly || align="center"|1 ||  align="center"| || 51 || 984 || 163 || 54 || 334 || 19.3 || 3.2 || 1.1 || 6.5 || align=center|

|-
|align="left"| || align="center"|G/F || align="left"|Purdue || align="center"|1 ||  align="center"| || 27 || 252 || 27 || 20 || 96 || 9.3 || 1.0 || 0.7 || 3.6 || align=center|

|-
|align="left"| || align="center"|G || align="left"|UConn || align="center"|1 ||  align="center"| || 82 || 1,401 || 170 || 234 || 341 || 17.1 || 2.1 || 2.9 || 4.2 || align=center|

|-
|align="left" bgcolor="#FFFF99"|^ || align="center"|C || align="left"|LSU || align="center"|1 ||  align="center"| || 53 || 1,240 || 355 || 80 || 636 || 23.4 || 6.7 || 1.5 || 12.0 || align=center|

|-
|align="left"| || align="center"|C || align="left"|Syracuse || align="center"|1 ||  align="center"| || 2 || 5 || 1 || 0 || 0 || 2.5 || 0.5 || 0.0 || 0.0 || align=center|

|-
|align="left" bgcolor="#CCFFCC"|x || align="center"|F || align="left"|Turkey || align="center"|2 ||  align="center"|– || 137 || 3,116 || 477 || 236 || 1,229 || 22.7 || 3.5 || 1.7 || 9.0 || align=center|

|-
|align="left"| || align="center"|G/F || align="left"|UNLV || align="center"|1 ||  align="center"| || 70 || 1,181 || 118 || 90 || 504 || 16.9 || 1.7 || 1.3 || 7.2 || align=center|

|-
|align="left"| || align="center"|G || align="left"|Colorado State || align="center"|1 ||  align="center"| || 80 || 1,976 || 235 || 259 || 397 || 24.7 || 2.9 || 3.2 || 5.0 || align=center|

|-
|align="left"| || align="center"|G || align="left"|Gonzaga || align="center"|1 ||  align="center"| || 25 || 447 || 32 || 64 || 196 || 17.9 || 1.3 || 2.6 || 7.8 || align=center|

|-
|align="left"| || align="center"|G || align="left"|Bradley || align="center"|3 ||  align="center"|– || 204 || 5,660 || 587 || 495 || 1,562 || 27.7 || 2.9 || 2.4 || 7.7 || align=center|

|-
|align="left"| || align="center"|G || align="left"|Fordham || align="center"|1 ||  align="center"| || 66 || 1,103 || 119 || 162 || 408 || 16.7 || 1.8 || 2.5 || 6.2 || align=center|

|-
|align="left"| || align="center"|C || align="left"|UCLA || align="center"|5 ||  align="center"|– || 298 || 4,800 || 1,432 || 372 || 1,388 || 16.1 || 4.8 || 1.2 || 4.7 || align=center|

|-
|align="left"| || align="center"|G/F || align="left"|Montenegro || align="center"|5 ||  align="center"|– || 302 || 5,450 || 564 || 333 || 1,843 || 18.0 || 1.9 || 1.1 || 6.1 || align=center|

|-
|align="left"| || align="center"|G || align="left"|Murray State || align="center"|1 ||  align="center"| || 9 || 176 || 19 || 23 || 74 || 19.6 || 2.1 || 2.6 || 8.2 || align=center|

|-
|align="left"| || align="center"|C || align="left"|Beaumont HS (TX) || align="center"|2 ||  align="center"| || 18 || 182 || 42 || 10 || 47 || 10.1 || 2.3 || 0.6 || 2.6 || align=center|

|-
|align="left"| || align="center"|G || align="left"|Virginia || align="center"|1 ||  align="center"| || 14 || 66 || 4 || 5 || 7 || 4.7 || 0.3 || 0.4 || 0.5 || align=center|

|-
|align="left"| || align="center"|G || align="left"|Auburn || align="center"|5 ||  align="center"|– || 328 || 10,347 || 1,196 || 651 || 3,924 || 31.5 || 3.6 || 2.0 || 12.0 || align=center|

|-
|align="left"| || align="center"|G/F || align="left"|Bradley || align="center"|2 ||  align="center"|– || 109 || 2,835 || 317 || 237 || 1,428 || 26.0 || 2.9 || 2.2 || 13.1 || align=center|

|-
|align="left"| || align="center"|G || align="left"|Southern || align="center"|6 ||  align="center"|– || 334 || 9,140 || 1,008 || 831 || 3,517 || 27.4 || 3.0 || 2.5 || 10.5 || align=center|

|-
|align="left"| || align="center"|C || align="left"|Kansas || align="center"|1 ||  align="center"| || 24 || 109 || 31 || 3 || 24 || 4.5 || 1.3 || 0.1 || 1.0 || align=center|

|-
|align="left"| || align="center"|F/C || align="left"|Central Michigan || align="center"|4 ||  align="center"|– || 248 || 4,447 || 1,105 || 234 || 1,236 || 17.9 || 4.5 || 0.9 || 5.0 || align=center|

|-
|align="left"| || align="center"|C || align="left"|Wright State || align="center"|3 ||  align="center"|– || 177 || 3,117 || 624 || 113 || 1,178 || 17.6 || 3.5 || 0.6 || 6.7 || align=center|

|-
|align="left"| || align="center"|F || align="left"|California || align="center"|2 ||  align="center"|– || 34 || 423 || 99 || 2 || 149 || 12.4 || 2.9 || 0.1 || 4.4 || align=center|

|-
|align="left"| || align="center"|G || align="left"|UConn || align="center"|1 ||  align="center"| || 11 || 87 || 15 || 13 || 22 || 7.9 || 1.4 || 1.2 || 2.0 || align=center|

|-
|align="left" bgcolor="#FFCC00"|+ (#25) || align="center"|G || align="left"|Georgia Tech || align="center"|9 ||  align="center"|– || 582 || 18,127 || 1,533 || 4,206 || 9,543 || 31.1 || 2.6 || 7.2 || 16.4 || align=center|
|}

Q to R

|-
|align="left"| || align="center"|G || align="left"|Notre Dame || align="center"|1 ||  align="center"| || 7 || 78 || 2 || 9 || 10 || 11.1 || 0.3 || 1.3 || 1.4 || align=center|

|-
|align="left"| || align="center"|C || align="left"|Xavier || align="center"|2 ||  align="center"|– || 83 || 1,499 || 415 || 69 || 582 || 18.1 || 5.0 || 0.8 || 7.0 || align=center|

|-
|align="left"| || align="center"|F || align="left"|North Carolina || align="center"|1 ||  align="center"| || 6 || 39 || 8 || 1 || 10 || 6.5 || 1.3 || 0.2 || 1.7 || align=center|

|-
|align="left"| || align="center"|F/C || align="left"|San Francisco || align="center"|1 ||  align="center"| || 34 || 338 || 77 || 15 || 53 || 9.9 || 2.3 || 0.4 || 1.6 || align=center|

|-
|align="left"| || align="center"|G || align="left"|California || align="center"|1 ||  align="center"| || 32 || 107 || 15 || 7 || 57 || 3.3 || 0.5 || 0.2 || 1.8 || align=center|

|-
|align="left"| || align="center"|F/C || align="left"|Cincinnati || align="center"|2 ||  align="center"|– || 125 || 4,334 || 1,494 || 243 || 1,604 || 34.7 || bgcolor="#CFECEC"|12.0 || 1.9 || 12.8 || align=center|

|-
|align="left"| || align="center"|F/C || align="left"|BYU || align="center"|1 ||  align="center"| || 21 || 223 || 34 || 8 || 80 || 10.6 || 1.6 || 0.4 || 3.8 || align=center|

|-
|align="left"| || align="center"|F || align="left"|USC || align="center"|3 ||  align="center"|– || 180 || 5,949 || 1,896 || 379 || 3,177 || 33.1 || 10.5 || 2.1 || 17.7 || align=center|

|-
|align="left"| || align="center"|G/F || align="left"|Centenary || align="center"|1 ||  align="center"| || 1 || 1 || 0 || 0 || 0 || 1.0 || 0.0 || 0.0 || 0.0 || align=center|

|-
|align="left"| || align="center"|F || align="left"|DePaul || align="center"|1 ||  align="center"| || 8 || 84 || 13 || 5 || 33 || 10.5 || 1.6 || 0.6 || 4.1 || align=center|

|-
|align="left"| || align="center"|F/C || align="left"|Kansas || align="center"|2 ||  align="center"|– || 93 || 3,042 || 743 || 236 || 1,358 || 32.7 || 8.0 || 2.5 || 14.6 || align=center|

|-
|align="left"| || align="center"|F/C || align="left"|UC Irvine || align="center"|1 ||  align="center"| || 24 || 168 || 27 || 3 || 62 || 7.0 || 1.1 || 0.1 || 2.6 || align=center|

|-
|align="left"| || align="center"|C || align="left"|Clemson || align="center"|2 ||  align="center"|– || 108 || 1,257 || 292 || 43 || 261 || 11.6 || 2.7 || 0.4 || 2.4 || align=center|

|-
|align="left"| || align="center"|G || align="left"|Memphis || align="center"|1 ||  align="center"| || 16 || 308 || 29 || 26 || 157 || 19.3 || 1.8 || 1.6 || 9.8 || align=center|

|-
|align="left"| || align="center"|F/C || align="left"|Colorado State || align="center"|2 ||  align="center"|– || 75 || 980 || 209 || 84 || 326 || 13.1 || 2.8 || 1.1 || 4.3 || align=center|

|-
|align="left" bgcolor="#FFCC00"|+ || align="center"|F || align="left"|Michigan || align="center"|7 ||  align="center"|– || 410 || 11,558 || 2,107 || 1,143 || 6,588 || 28.2 || 5.1 || 2.8 || 16.1 || align=center|
|}

S

|-
|align="left"| || align="center"|F || align="left"|Louisville || align="center"|3 ||  align="center"|– || 109 || 1,722 || 366 || 45 || 638 || 15.8 || 3.4 || 0.4 || 5.9 || align=center|

|-
|align="left"| || align="center"|F/C || align="left"|VCU || align="center"|1 ||  align="center"| || 5 || 13 || 4 || 0 || 4 || 2.6 || 0.8 || 0.0 || 0.8 || align=center|

|-
|align="left"| || align="center"|G/F || align="left"|UCLA || align="center"|4 ||  align="center"|–– || 180 || 4,260 || 612 || 276 || 1,574 || 23.7 || 3.4 || 1.5 || 8.7 || align=center|

|-
|align="left"| || align="center"|C || align="left"|St. John's || align="center"|2 ||  align="center"|– || 57 || 238 || 75 || 8 || 64 || 4.2 || 1.3 || 0.1 || 1.1 || align=center|

|-
|align="left"| || align="center"|G || align="left"|Nevada || align="center"|2 ||  align="center"|– || 122 || 3,139 || 382 || 631 || 1,505 || 25.7 || 3.1 || 5.2 || 12.3 || align=center|

|-
|align="left" bgcolor="#CCFFCC"|x || align="center"|G || align="left"|Alabama || align="center"|1 ||  align="center"| || 82 || 2,605 || 236 || 243 || 1,371 || 31.8 || 2.9 || 3.0 || 16.7 || align=center|

|-
|align="left"| || align="center"|F/C || align="left"|Oregon State || align="center"|3 ||  align="center"|– || 180 || 4,027 || 791 || 336 || 1,415 || 22.4 || 4.4 || 1.9 || 7.9 || align=center|

|-
|align="left"| || align="center"|G || align="left"|Georgia Tech || align="center"|4 ||  align="center"|– || 182 || 4,449 || 605 || 275 || 1,212 || 24.4 || 3.3 || 1.5 || 6.7 || align=center|

|-
|align="left"| || align="center"|G || align="left"|Stephen F. Austin || align="center"|1 ||  align="center"| || 67 || 1,447 || 109 || 222 || 748 || 21.6 || 1.6 || 3.3 || 11.2 || align=center|

|-
|align="left"| || align="center"|F || align="left"|NC State || align="center"|1 ||  align="center"| || 7 || 68 || 15 || 0 || 4 || 9.7 || 2.1 || 0.0 || 0.6 || align=center|

|-
|align="left"| || align="center"|G || align="left"|Arizona || align="center"|1 ||  align="center"| || 1 || 2 || 0 || 0 || 0 || 2.0 || 0.0 || 0.0 || 0.0 || align=center|

|-
|align="left"| || align="center"|C || align="left"|Georgetown || align="center"|1 ||  align="center"| || 20 || 168 || 56 || 5 || 44 || 8.4 || 2.8 || 0.3 || 2.2 || align=center|

|-
|align="left"| || align="center"|F || align="left"|Baylor || align="center"|1 ||  align="center"| || 65 || 1,107 || 281 || 17 || 224 || 17.0 || 4.3 || 0.3 || 3.4 || align=center|

|-
|align="left"| || align="center"|G || align="left"|Texas A&M || align="center"|2 ||  align="center"|– || 45 || 865 || 87 || 129 || 246 || 19.2 || 1.9 || 2.9 || 5.5 || align=center|

|-
|align="left"| (#7) || align="center"|G/F || align="left"|Tulsa || align="center"|10 ||  align="center"|– || 720 || 19,221 || 3,057 || 1,566 || 9,513 || 26.7 || 4.2 || 2.2 || 13.2 || align=center|

|-
|align="left"| || align="center"|C || align="left"|Kentucky State || align="center"|3 ||  align="center"|– || 141 || 3,003 || 1,015 || 83 || 1,477 || 21.3 || 7.2 || 0.6 || 10.5 || align=center|

|-
|align="left"| || align="center"|G/F || align="left"|Saint Benedict's Prep. (NJ) || align="center"|5 ||  align="center"|– || 255 || 7,476 || 743 || 468 || 2,628 || 29.3 || 2.9 || 1.8 || 10.3 || align=center|

|-
|align="left"| || align="center"|F || align="left"|Maryland || align="center"|2 ||  align="center"|– || 48 || 991 || 236 || 35 || 355 || 20.6 || 4.9 || 0.7 || 7.4 || align=center|

|-
|align="left"| || align="center"|G/F || align="left"|Buffalo State || align="center"|2 ||  align="center"|– || 164 || 4,876 || 449 || 720 || 2,635 || 29.7 || 2.7 || 4.4 || 16.1 || align=center|

|-
|align="left"| || align="center"|G || align="left"|UNLV || align="center"|2 ||  align="center"| || 8 || 68 || 7 || 10 || 24 || 8.5 || 0.9 || 1.3 || 3.0 || align=center|

|-
|align="left"| || align="center"|G || align="left"|Missouri || align="center"|1 ||  align="center"| || 62 || 1,051 || 121 || 259 || 299 || 17.0 || 2.0 || 4.2 || 4.8 || align=center|

|-
|align="left"| || align="center"|G || align="left"|Michigan State || align="center"|4 ||  align="center"|– || 267 || 6,429 || 561 || 1,035 || 1,077 || 24.1 || 2.1 || 3.9 || 4.0 || align=center|

|-
|align="left"| || align="center"|G/F || align="left"|Davidson || align="center"|4 ||  align="center"|– || 304 || 7,209 || 634 || 717 || 3,237 || 23.7 || 2.1 || 2.4 || 10.6 || align=center|

|-
|align="left"| || align="center"|F || align="left"|Ohio State || align="center"|3 ||  align="center"|– || 165 || 3,231 || 824 || 249 || 1,449 || 19.6 || 5.0 || 1.5 || 8.8 || align=center|

|-
|align="left"| || align="center"|F/C || align="left"|Florida || align="center"|1 ||  align="center"| || 39 || 721 || 197 || 29 || 396 || 18.5 || 5.1 || 0.7 || 10.2 || align=center|

|-
|align="left"| || align="center"|F || align="left"|South Carolina || align="center"|2 ||  align="center"|– || 43 || 397 || 79 || 10 || 99 || 9.2 || 1.8 || 0.2 || 2.3 || align=center|

|-
|align="left"| || align="center"|G || align="left"|Michigan || align="center"|1 ||  align="center"| || 24 || 342 || 47 || 19 || 132 || 14.3 || 2.0 || 0.8 || 5.5 || align=center|

|-
|align="left"| || align="center"|C || align="left"|California || align="center"|2 ||  align="center"|– || 55 || 327 || 73 || 6 || 44 || 5.9 || 1.3 || 0.1 || 0.8 || align=center|

|-
|align="left"| || align="center"|G || align="left"|Virginia || align="center"|1 ||  align="center"| || 50 || 665 || 85 || 42 || 208 || 13.3 || 1.7 || 0.8 || 4.2 || align=center|

|-
|align="left"| || align="center"|F/C || align="left"|Midwestern State || align="center"|1 ||  align="center"| || 30 || 140 || 41 || 2 || 42 || 4.7 || 1.4 || 0.1 || 1.4 || align=center|

|-
|align="left"| || align="center"|C || align="left"|Croatia || align="center"|1 ||  align="center"| || 4 || 29 || 10 || 0 || 9 || 7.3 || 2.5 || 0.0 || 2.3 || align=center|

|-
|align="left"| || align="center"|G || align="left"|Florida State || align="center"|5 ||  align="center"|– || 330 || 7,418 || 927 || 1,230 || 2,667 || 22.5 || 2.8 || 3.7 || 8.1 || align=center|

|-
|align="left"| || align="center"|F || align="left"|Miami (OH) || align="center"|2 ||  align="center"|– || 99 || 2,083 || 313 || 117 || 722 || 21.0 || 3.2 || 1.2 || 7.3 || align=center|
|}

T to V

|-
|align="left"| || align="center"|G/F || align="left"|Marquette || align="center"|1 ||  align="center"| || 33 || 225 || 26 || 20 || 85 || 6.8 || 0.8 || 0.6 || 2.6 || align=center|

|-
|align="left"| || align="center"|C || align="left"|Cape Verde || align="center"|1 ||  align="center"| || 1 || 24 || 10 || 1 || 6 || 24.0 || 10.0 || 1.0 || 6.0 || align=center|

|-
|align="left"| || align="center"|G || align="left"|Abraham Lincoln HS (NY) || align="center"|1 ||  align="center"| || 4 || 77 || 4 || 12 || 39 || 19.3 || 1.0 || 3.0 || 9.8 || align=center|

|-
|align="left"| || align="center"|G || align="left"|Kansas || align="center"|1 ||  align="center"| || 7 || 34 || 2 || 0 || 12 || 4.9 || 0.3 || 0.0 || 1.7 || align=center|

|-
|align="left"| || align="center"|G || align="left"|Eastern Michigan || align="center"|2 ||  align="center"|– || 48 || 349 || 50 || 17 || 98 || 7.3 || 1.0 || 0.4 || 2.0 || align=center|

|-
|align="left"| || align="center"|G || align="left"|Washington || align="center"|1 ||  align="center"| || 15 || 406 || 31 || 68 || 221 || 27.1 || 2.1 || 4.5 || 14.7 || align=center|

|-
|align="left"| || align="center"|G || align="left"|Pepperdine || align="center"|1 ||  align="center"| || 5 || 95 || 5 || 7 || 18 || 19.0 || 1.0 || 1.4 || 3.6 || align=center|

|-
|align="left"| || align="center"|G/F || align="left"|Tulane || align="center"|2 ||  align="center"|– || 115 || 2,446 || 428 || 180 || 1,089 || 21.3 || 3.7 || 1.6 || 9.5 || align=center|

|-
|align="left" bgcolor="#CCFFCC"|x || align="center"|F/C || align="left"|Texas || align="center"|8 ||  align="center"|– || 562 || 15,651 || 4,816 || 504 || 5,155 || 27.8 || 8.6 || 0.9 || 9.2 || align=center|

|-
|align="left" bgcolor="#FFFF99"|^ (#42) || align="center"|F/C || align="left"|Bowling Green || align="center"|2 ||  align="center"|– || 114 || 2,130 || 718 || 151 || 566 || 18.7 || 6.3 || 1.3 || 5.0 || align=center|

|-
|align="left"| || align="center"|F/C || align="left"|Cleveland State || align="center"|1 ||  align="center"| || 37 || 482 || 121 || 16 || 152 || 13.0 || 3.3 || 0.4 || 4.1 || align=center|

|-
|align="left"| || align="center"|G || align="left"|Dayton || align="center"|1 ||  align="center"| || 12 || 64 || 3 || 11 || 6 || 5.3 || 0.3 || 0.9 || 0.5 || align=center|

|-
|align="left"| || align="center"|F || align="left"|Michigan || align="center"|2 ||  align="center"| || 144 || 2,539 || 632 || 124 || 811 || 17.6 || 4.4 || 0.9 || 5.6 || align=center|

|-
|align="left"| || align="center"|G || align="left"|USC || align="center"|1 ||  align="center"| || 12 || 77 || 12 || 12 || 18 || 6.4 || 1.0 || 1.0 || 1.5 || align=center|

|-
|align="left"| || align="center"|C || align="left"|Kentucky || align="center"|3 ||  align="center"|– || 223 || 5,042 || 1,198 || 124 || 2,325 || 22.6 || 5.4 || 0.6 || 10.4 || align=center|

|-
|align="left"| || align="center"|G || align="left"|Tulsa || align="center"|1 ||  align="center"| || 2 || 13 || 4 || 2 || 4 || 6.5 || 2.0 || 1.0 || 2.0 || align=center|

|-
|align="left"| || align="center"|G || align="left"|Kansas || align="center"|2 ||  align="center"| || 142 || 2,927 || 275 || 525 || 975 || 20.6 || 1.9 || 3.7 || 6.9 || align=center|

|-
|align="left"| || align="center"|F/C || align="left"|Brazil || align="center" bgcolor="#CFECEC"|12 ||  align="center"|– || 591 || 14,773 || 4,434 || 709 || 4,485 || 25.0 || 7.5 || 1.2 || 7.6 || align=center|

|-
|align="left"| || align="center"|F || align="left"|Notre Dame || align="center"|1 ||  align="center"| || 1 || 4 || 2 || 0 || 2 || 4.0 || 2.0 || 0.0 || 2.0 || align=center|
|}

W to Z

|-
|align="left"| || align="center"|G || align="left"|Marquette || align="center"|1 ||  align="center"| || 46 || 1,069 || 181 || 163 || 513 || 23.2 || 3.9 || 3.5 || 11.2 || align=center|

|-
|align="left"| || align="center"|G || align="left"|Memphis || align="center"|3 ||  align="center"|– || 102 || 2,195 || 142 || 194 || 960 || 21.5 || 1.4 || 1.9 || 9.4 || align=center|

|-
|align="left"| || align="center"|G || align="left"|Syracuse || align="center"|3 ||  align="center"|– || 164 || 4,614 || 401 || 466 || 2,352 || 28.1 || 2.4 || 2.8 || 14.3 || align=center|

|-
|align="left"| || align="center"|G || align="left"|West Georgia || align="center"|6 ||  align="center"|– || 427 || 10,237 || 1,267 || 2,115 || 3,073 || 24.0 || 3.0 || 5.0 || 7.2 || align=center|

|-
|align="left"| || align="center"|F/C || align="left"|Virginia Union || align="center"|2 ||  align="center"|– || 78 || 1,892 || 525 || 57 || 258 || 24.3 || 6.7 || 0.7 || 3.3 || align=center|

|-
|align="left"| || align="center"|F || align="left"|Arizona || align="center"|2 ||  align="center"|– || 71 || 1,156 || 180 || 196 || 215 || 16.3 || 2.5 || 2.8 || 3.0 || align=center|

|-
|align="left"| || align="center"|F/C || align="left"|Jackson State || align="center"|2 ||  align="center"|– || 73 || 1,372 || 524 || 70 || 398 || 18.8 || 7.2 || 1.0 || 5.5 || align=center|

|-
|align="left"| || align="center"|G/F || align="left"|St. John's || align="center"|4 ||  align="center"|– || 259 || 4,659 || 647 || 534 || 1,702 || 18.0 || 2.5 || 2.1 || 6.6 || align=center|

|-
|align="left"| || align="center"|G || align="left"|Eastern Kentucky || align="center"|2 ||  align="center"|– || 116 || 1,790 || 234 || 413 || 700 || 15.4 || 2.0 || 3.6 || 6.0 || align=center|

|-
|align="left"| || align="center"|F/C || align="left"|UCLA || align="center"|2 ||  align="center"|– || 87 || 1,818 || 444 || 128 || 790 || 20.9 || 5.1 || 1.5 || 9.1 || align=center|

|-
|align="left"| || align="center"|F || align="left"|Southern Miss || align="center"|1 ||  align="center"| || 82 || 2,774 || 796 || 103 || 924 || 33.8 || 9.7 || 1.3 || 11.3 || align=center|

|-
|align="left"| || align="center"|G/F || align="left"|Colorado || align="center"|2 ||  align="center"|– || 89 || 2,928 || 512 || 219 || 1,225 || 32.9 || 5.8 || 2.5 || 13.8 || align=center|

|-
|align="left"| || align="center"|G || align="left"|Czech Republic || align="center"|1 ||  align="center"| || 16 || 192 || 28 || 19 || 46 || 12.0 || 1.8 || 1.2 || 2.9 || align=center|

|-
|align="left"| || align="center"|G || align="left"|Baylor || align="center"|1 ||  align="center"| || 35 || 352 || 35 || 37 || 73 || 10.1 || 1.0 || 1.1 || 2.1 || align=center|

|-
|align="left"| || align="center"|C || align="left"|Kansas || align="center"|3 ||  align="center"|– || 176 || 4,720 || 1,462 || 166 || 2,511 || 26.8 || 8.3 || 0.9 || 14.3 || align=center|

|-
|align="left"| || align="center"|G || align="left"|Saint Joseph's || align="center"|3 ||  align="center"|– || 150 || 4,458 || 469 || 538 || 1,547 || 29.7 || 3.1 || 3.6 || 10.3 || align=center|

|-
|align="left"| || align="center"|F/C || align="left"|Old Dominion || align="center"|5 ||  align="center"|– || 334 || 5,529 || 1,378 || 145 || 1,726 || 16.6 || 4.1 || 0.4 || 5.2 || align=center|

|-
|align="left"| || align="center"|G || align="left"|Alabama || align="center"|1 ||  align="center"| || 8 || 66 || 7 || 13 || 22 || 8.3 || 0.9 || 1.6 || 2.8 || align=center|

|-
|align="left"| || align="center"|F/C || align="left"|Marquette || align="center"|1 ||  align="center"| || 3 || 8 || 3 || 0 || 2 || 2.7 || 1.0 || 0.0 || 0.7 || align=center|

|-
|align="left" bgcolor="#FFFF99"|^ || align="center"|G || align="left"|Providence || align="center"|2 ||  align="center"|– || 149 || 5,456 || 623 || 1,150 || 2,751 || 36.6 || 4.2 || 7.7 || 18.5 || align=center|

|-
|align="left"| || align="center"|G/F || align="left"|Indiana || align="center"|2 ||  align="center"|– || 142 || 3,507 || 492 || 426 || 1,235 || 24.7 || 3.5 || 3.0 || 8.7 || align=center|

|-
|align="left"| || align="center"|G/F || align="left"|Chattanooga || align="center"|2 ||  align="center"|– || 162 || 4,847 || 517 || 438 || 2,060 || 29.9 || 3.2 || 2.7 || 12.7 || align=center|

|-
|align="left"| || align="center"|G || align="left"|Rice || align="center"|1 ||  align="center"| || 37 || 243 || 27 || 18 || 42 || 6.6 || 0.7 || 0.5 || 1.1 || align=center|

|-
|align="left"| || align="center"|G || align="left"|Kansas State || align="center"|1 ||  align="center"| || 22 || 65 || 4 || 7 || 37 || 3.0 || 0.2 || 0.3 || 1.7 || align=center|

|-
|align="left"| || align="center"|G || align="left"|Illinois || align="center"|1 ||  align="center"| || 24 || 486 || 45 || 86 || 179 || 20.3 || 1.9 || 3.6 || 7.5 || align=center|

|-
|align="left"| || align="center"|F || align="left"|Arizona || align="center"|1 ||  align="center"| || 25 || 427 || 57 || 14 || 156 || 17.1 || 2.3 || 0.6 || 6.2 || align=center|

|-
|align="left"| || align="center"|F || align="left"|Providence || align="center"|1 ||  align="center"| || 50 || 1,373 || 191 || 95 || 469 || 27.5 || 3.8 || 1.9 || 9.4 || align=center|

|-
|align="left"| || align="center"|F/C || align="left"|Tulane || align="center"|9 ||  align="center"|– || 661 || 20,802 || 4,669 || 1,366 || 8,504 || 31.5 || 7.1 || 2.1 || 12.9 || align=center|

|-
|align="left"| || align="center"|F || align="left"|North Carolina || align="center"|3 ||  align="center"|– || 90 || 1,153 || 133 || 56 || 340 || 12.8 || 1.5 || 0.6 || 3.8 || align=center|

|-
|align="left"| || align="center"|G || align="left"|St. John's || align="center"|1 ||  align="center"| || 46 || 413 || 63 || 61 || 163 || 9.0 || 1.4 || 1.3 || 3.5 || align=center|

|-
|align="left" bgcolor="#FFCC00"|+ || align="center"|G || align="left"|Alabama || align="center"|4 ||  align="center"|– || 227 || 7,006 || 654 || 1,052 || 3,350 || 30.9 || 2.9 || 4.6 || 14.8 || align=center|

|-
|align="left"| || align="center"|G/F || align="left"|Georgetown || align="center"|1 ||  align="center"| || 32 || 542 || 60 || 38 || 218 || 16.9 || 1.9 || 1.2 || 6.8 || align=center|

|-
|align="left"| || align="center"|F/C || align="left"|North Carolina || align="center"|1 ||  align="center"| || 19 || 152 || 30 || 8 || 33 || 8.0 || 1.6 || 0.4 || 1.7 || align=center|

|-
|align="left"| || align="center"|F/C || align="left"|Dwight Morrow HS (NJ) || align="center"|1 ||  align="center"| || 78 || 1,447 || 329 || 72 || 535 || 18.6 || 4.2 || 0.9 || 6.9 || align=center|

|-
|align="left"| || align="center"|G || align="left"|Marquette || align="center"|1 ||  align="center"| || 11 || 175 || 18 || 24 || 77 || 15.9 || 1.6 || 2.2 || 7.0 || align=center|

|-
|align="left"| || align="center"|C || align="left"|Ohio State || align="center"|3 ||  align="center"|– || 118 || 1,098 || 357 || 60 || 372 || 9.3 || 3.0 || 0.5 || 3.2 || align=center|

|-
|align="left"| || align="center"|G/F || align="left"|Indiana || align="center"|1 ||  align="center"| || 4 || 46 || 2 || 5 || 11 || 11.5 || 0.5 || 1.3 || 2.8 || align=center|

|-
|align="left"| || align="center"|F/C || align="left"|Memphis || align="center"|1 ||  align="center"| || 17 || 125 || 25 || 3 || 23 || 7.4 || 1.5 || 0.2 || 1.4 || align=center|
|-
|align="left"| || align="center"|F/C || align="left"|North Carolina || align="center"|2 ||  align="center"|– || 147 || 3,082 || 720 || 132 || 1,009 || 21.0 || 4.9 || 0.9 || 6.9 || align=center|

|-
|align="left" bgcolor="#CCFFCC"|x || align="center"|F/C || align="left"|Croatia || align="center"|2 ||  align="center"|– || 91 || 1,296 || 380 || 58 || 578 || 14.2 || 4.2 || 0.6 || 6.4 || align=center|
|}

External links
Cleveland Cavaliers all-time roster

References

National Basketball Association all-time rosters

roster